Guillaume Chartier ( 1386 – 1 May 1472) was a French bishop.

Biographie 
Born in Bayeux, Guillaume was the brother of Alain Chartier. He was appointed bishop of Paris on 6 December 1447. Twelve years later he was France's ambassador to the Council of Mantua, at which delivered a speech in Latin which lasted over two hours.

He backed cathedral chapters' rights to elect bishops against royal attempts to take over that right. During the League of the Public Weal era he joined the mécontents. He held onto his bishopric until his death, but Louis XI of France recorded his hostility on Chartier's tomb - that epitaph was later replaced by a more honourable one.

References

Sources
Clavel de St Geniez, Histoire chrétienne des diocèses de France, de Belgique, de Savoie et des bords du Rhin, 1885

People from Bayeux
Bishops of Paris
1274 deaths
15th-century French Roman Catholic bishops